Seydine Mohamadou N'Diaye (born 23 April 1998) is a French professional footballer who plays as a defender.

Club career
N'Diaye began his career in his home nation of France, playing for Championnat National 3 side Vaulx-en-Velin. He made his senior debut for them in a 4–2 away victory over Chamalières.

N'Diaye then moved to Swiss club Chaux-de-Fonds on a free transfer, but only stayed for a season before returning to his former club. He scored his first goal in senior football on his return to Vaulx-en-Velin in a 2–1 away defeat to Montluçon. N'Diaye then moved to Lyon La Duchère on a free transfer, and scored three goals including a spell in the reserve side.

On 6 August 2021, Göztepe announced the signing of N'Diaye, and a day later loaned him out to Dutch side FC Dordrecht. He made his debut in professional football, playing the full 90 minutes in a 2–1 away win against Jong Ajax. N'Diaye scored his first goal in professional football in a 2–2 home draw against Jong FC Utrecht, in which he also registered an assist.

On 9 July 2022, N'Diaye signed for Portuguese side Sporting da Covilhã on a free transfer.

References

External links
 
 

1998 births
Living people
French footballers
Association football defenders
FC Vaulx-en-Velin players
FC La Chaux-de-Fonds players
Lyon La Duchère players
FC Dordrecht players
S.C. Covilhã players
Championnat National 3 players
Championnat National players
Swiss Promotion League players
Eerste Divisie players
French expatriate footballers
Expatriate footballers in Switzerland
French expatriate sportspeople in Switzerland
Expatriate footballers in the Netherlands
French expatriate sportspeople in the Netherlands
Expatriate footballers in Portugal
French expatriate sportspeople in Portugal